Hexic 2 is the sequel to Alexey Pajitnov's puzzle game Hexic, developed by Carbonated Games. It was released on August 15, 2007.

Gameplay 

The board is one column longer than in the original game to allow for a more effective use of the board and remove two impossible hexagons accessed by the grid (the hexagon in the upper right and the hexagon in the lower right). Hexagons in Hexic 2 are colored red, blue, yellow, green, silver, white, and black.

It is even hinted with various screenshots that new skins are available, but possibly as a power for the new multiplayer mode. Combos are still achieved by rotating the cursor in a similar manner to the previous incarnations of the game. Starflower tiles are formed in much the same way, but the black pearl tiles are a bit more challenging to form this time around.

New to Hexic 2 is the "Battle" mode, where the player is pitted against the computer (or another player via Xbox Live) in a race to fill their meter bar before the other (see screenshot above). This is done by clearing pieces from the board, as well as deploying various "attacks" on the opponent.

"Marathon," "Timed Marathon," and "Survival" also return in Hexic 2, with the new alterations for the game implemented into the Gameplay.

New pieces and features 
 Emeralds – 2 piece changer tile. Emeralds are created by forming a row or line of 5 or more same-colored pieces or circling one piece by 6 pieces with all 6 having 1 color. The resulting piece is an Emerald. Lining up 5 or more Emeralds will result in a Starflower or circling one piece by 6 Emeralds.
 Rubies – 4 piece changer tile. Rubies are created by lining up 5 or more Starflowers in a row or circling one piece by 6 Starflowers.
 Black Pearls are no longer created by circling one piece by 6 Starflowers; they are now formed by lining up 5 or more Rubies in a row, or circling one piece by 6 Rubies.
Lines or Rows – Forming a line of 5 or more pieces results in the creation of at least one of the next piece in chain of command.  Color > Emerald > Starflower > Ruby > Black Pearl.  The line in effect creates pieces in all positions of the original line minus the two pieces at each end (#-4).  So, using an extreme example, if a line of 11 Starflowers is made (2 rows of 4, then rotate in 3 in the middle), 7 Rubies are made, and a line of 7 Rubies makes 3 Black Pearls.
Detonation – Emeralds, Starflowers, Rubies and Black Pearls can be detonated on the player's command.  The explosion causes some of the adjacent pieces to explode, making it easier to destroy "locked" pieces or clear bombs.
Chain Reactions – If a piece that is detonated has an Emerald, Starflower, Ruby or Black Pearl next to it, the initial explosion will cause the 2nd piece to explode, which in turn blows up the pieces that are adjacent to it.  In this manner, long chains of pieces can be linked together and detonated in a single massive chain reaction.

Bug and fix 
The Marathon mode featured a bug in which saved games would remove the bomb threat from the boards, allowing players to play forever. On September 23, 2007, an update fixed this bug, among other minor tweaks.

2007 video games
Alexey Pajitnov games
Carbonated Games games
Microsoft games
Multiplayer and single-player video games
Puzzle video games
Video games developed in the United States
Xbox 360 games
Xbox 360 Live Arcade games
Xbox 360-only games